Bolyai is an old lunar impact crater that is located in the southern hemisphere on the far side of the Moon. To the southeast of Bolyai is the crater Eötvös, and to the north is Neujmin. It is named after the 19th century Hungarian mathematician János Bolyai.

This crater has been heavily eroded and worn by subsequent impacts, leaving only a deformed remnant of the original rim that is overlaid by a multitude of lesser craters. The most notable of these is Bolyai D along the northeast rim and Bolyai W to the northwest. The latter is actually a formation of multiply overlapping craters.

The interior of the crater is relatively level, but rough in places due to impacts that have reshaped the surface. Near the rounded central peak, and from there towards the northern rim, is a section of floor that has been resurfaced by lava flows. This area is smoother than the remainder of the floor, and has a lower albedo, giving it a dark appearance.

Satellite craters 

By convention these features are identified on lunar maps by placing the letter on the side of the crater midpoint that is closest to Bolyai.

References 

 
 
 
 
 
 
 
 
 
 
 
 

Impact craters on the Moon